Connor Gordon (born September 11, 1996) is an American soccer player.

Playing career

College and amateur
Gordon played five years of college soccer at Concordia University, Irvine, between 2014 and 2018, missing most of 2017 through injury.

While at the college, Gordon also appeared for the USL Premier Development League sides FC Golden State Force in 2016, Southern California Seahorses in 2017, and Orange County SC U-23 in 2018. Similarly, Gordon appeared for the National Premier Soccer League side Orange County FC in 2017.

Professional
On January 30, 2019, Gordon signed with USL Championship side Orange County SC.

References 

1996 births
Living people
American soccer players
Association football forwards
FC Golden State Force players
Orange County SC players
Orange County SC U-23 players
Soccer players from California
Southern California Seahorses players
Sportspeople from Huntington Beach, California
USL Championship players
USL League Two players